Royal Knokke Football Club is a Belgian association football club based in Knokke, West Flanders.

History 
The club was founded in 1905.

In 2016–17, Knokke won the Second Amateur Division winning promotion to the First Amateur Division. After another successful season, Knokke finished second in the league standing, allowing them to participate in the final play-off round for promotion. Knokke won the final round, but did not apply for a licence for second-tier Belgian First Division B, which meant that only Lommel promoted.

The following year, the club finished last in the table and relegated to the Second Amateur Division. There, they regained the league title and won promotion – albeit in a special way. Due to the COVID-19 pandemic, the Royal Belgian Football Association decided on 27 March 2020 to cancel all competitions and to determine the final rankings. Knokke had at that point played 24 games in the Second Amateur Division and finished on top with 63 points, forcing promotion back to the First Amateur Division.

Current squad

Honours 
 Champion of 2016–17 Belgian Second Amateur Division A

References

External links 
 

Belgian Second Amateur Division
Football clubs in Belgium
Association football clubs established in 1905
1905 establishments in Belgium